Pardhan Kaur was the spouse of Zail Singh, President of India who served as First Lady of India.

Personal life 
She married Zail Singh and had one son and three daughters. On 13 May 2002, she died as a widow.

References 

First ladies and gentlemen of India
2002 deaths
Year of birth missing